Xiluoyuan Subdistrict is one of the 21 subdivisions of Fengtai District, Beijing, China. It is located on the northeast of Fengtai, borders Yongdingmenwai Subdistrict to the northeast, Dahongmen Subdistrict and Nayuan Township to the south and east, Majiabao Subdistrict and Huaxiang Township to the southwest, and You'anmen Subdistrict to the northwest. It has a population of 83,815 by 2020.

The subdistrict got its current name due to its origin as an estate of Luo family during Ming dynasty, which was later split into east and west portion as inheritances to two brothers.

History

Administrative Division 
By 2021, the subdistrict is divided into 22 residential communities:

See also 

 List of township-level divisions of Beijing

References 

Fengtai District
Subdistricts of Beijing